Triodontolaimus is a monotypic genus of nematodes belonging to the monotypic family Triodontolaimidae. The only species is Triodontolaimus acutus.

The species is found in Northern Europe.

References

Enoplea
Enoplea genera
Monotypic animal genera